Setterfield is a surname. Notable people with the surname include:

Diane Setterfield (born 1964), English writer
Ivor Setterfield, British conductor and singer
Valda Setterfield (born 1934), English dancer and actress